Irina Volodymyrivna "Rusya" Poryvai (born June 9, 1968) is a Ukrainian singer, and musician. She released her first song Don't stand by my window in 1989. Rusya had Top 10 hits on the Ukrainian charts in the late 1980s, and through the early and mid 1990s. She is a two-time winner in category Best Female Artist of Ukraine in 1990 and 1991. Rusya retired from recording pop music in 1997 but continued to tour (sometimes with her sister, Natasha Koroleva) till 1999. In 2007, she returned to recording with an album "The Best of Rusya".

Discography

1989 – "The Fortuneteller"
1989 – "Christmas Eve"
1990 – "Forgive me,mommy"
1991 – "Cinderella"
1991 – "Rusya"
1991 - "Little Happiness"
1992 – "Rusya's Greatest Hits"
1994 –  "Kiyv Girl"
1994 – "Cheremshyna"
1997 – "My American Guy"
1998 -  "White Lace"
2007 – "The Best of Rusya"
2009 – "Small Presents"
2012 – "Christmas Presents"
2012 – "Greatest Hits -top 40"
2017 – "Memories of the future"

References

Websites and resources
Russya's official website.Офіційна українська веб-сторінка Русі
Natasha Koroleva's web site
http://kmstudio.com.ua/index.php?nma=cherem&fla=stat&nm=rusia

Ukrainian women singers
1968 births
Living people
Musicians from Kyiv
Ukrainian pop singers
Ukrainian emigrants to Canada
R. Glier Kyiv Institute of Music alumni